Hapsburg Liebe, born Charles Haven Liebe, (1880-1957) was an  American author and screenwriter. His stories were published in Adventure, The Black Cat, The Railroad Trainman, The Green Book Magazine, Boys' Life  and Florida Wildlife.

Liebe grew up in the mountains of East Tennessee. He served in the Philippines during the Spanish-American War. During the First World War Liebe was accused of being a German writer because of his name. Liebe denied this, and stated that his ancestors were Dutch and English Americans. Liebe later did propaganda writing for the U.S. military as part of the group of writers known as The Vigilantes.

Bibliography
The Clan Call

Filmography
Circumstantial Evidence (1912) based on Liebe's story "The Little Good"
A Society Sensation (1918)
The Everlasting Light (1922)
Trimmed (1922)
The Broad Road (1923)

References

External links
 

1880 births
1957 deaths
20th-century American male writers
20th-century American writers
American magazine writers
American male screenwriters
20th-century American short story writers
American military personnel of the Spanish–American War
People from Johnson City, Tennessee
American people of Dutch descent
American people of English descent
20th-century American screenwriters